The 1980-81 Cleveland Cavaliers season was the 11th season of the franchise in the National Basketball Association (NBA).

Draft picks

Roster

Regular season

Season standings

Notes
 z, y – division champions
 x – clinched playoff spot

Record vs. opponents

Game log

|-style="background:#cfc;"
| 19 || November 13, 1980 || Atlanta
| W 114–111
|
|
|
| Coliseum at Richfield3,987
| 5–14

|-style="background:#cfc;"
| 43 || January 9, 1981 || @ Atlanta
| W 108–107 (OT)
|
|
|
| The Omni9,398
| 16–27
|-style="background:#cfc;"
| 51 || January 23, 1981 || @ Atlanta
| W 106–98
|
|
|
| The Omni9,820
| 20–31

|- align="center"
|colspan="9" bgcolor="#bbcaff"|All-Star Break
|-style="background:#fcc;"
| 64 || February 21, 1981 || Atlanta
| L 105–118
|
|
|
| Coliseum at Richfield8,231
| 25–39

|-style="background:#cfc;"
| 73 || March 14, 1981 || @ Atlanta
| W 112–110 (OT)
|
|
|
| The Omni7,368
| 26–47
|-style="background:#cfc;"
| 75 || March 17, 1981 || Atlanta
| W 122–107
|
|
|
| Coliseum at Richfield4,288
| 28–47

Player statistics

Player Statistics Citation:

Awards and records

Awards

Records

Milestones

All-Star

Transactions

Free Agents

References

Cleveland Cavaliers seasons
Cleveland Cavaliers
Cleveland Cavaliers
Cl